Athletes and artists who identify as lesbian, gay, bisexual, transgender, pansexual, non-binary, queer, and/or intersex, and/or who have openly been in a same-sex relationship (LGBTQI+) have competed in the Olympic and Paralympic Games, either openly, or having come out some time afterward. 

Alongside the Olympics, international multi-sport events have also been organized specifically for LGBT+ athletes, including the EuroGames, Gay Games and World OutGames.

Ancient Olympic Games 

The concept of homosexuality did not exist, at least not as understood in the modern era, in Greece at the time of the ancient Olympic Games. Sexuality was defined by the role one took (active – erastes – or passive – in the case of homosexual relationships, eromenos), rather than by gender, and most men would have taken part in homosexual or pederastic activity. Social roles were connected with the sexual roles, with dominant and adult men to be active and women, young men, and those of low status to be passive. The passive role in men was associated with effeminacy, supposedly an undesirable trait in adults. However, sometimes these roles were flouted, with dominant adult men continuing to have homosexual relationships. Classicist Kenneth Dover has suggested that there would have been social stigma aimed at the passive male in an adult homosexual relationship.

David Stone Potter has discussed the prevailing sexuality in the culture of athletics in ancient Greece, saying that some gymnasiums had to ban men attending purely to pick up other men. Pederasty in sports was elegised by Theognis of Megara in writing "Happy is the lover who, after spending time in the gymnasium, goes home to sleep all day long with a beautiful, young man." Classicists have noted the development of a specific athletic pederasty in the seventh century BC, with Thomas F. Scanlon writing that "the high value placed on an athletic type of physical beauty and nudity contributed to the establishment of gymnnasia and the sanctioning of homosexuality among athletes". Scanlon suggested that widespread pederasty in Greece may have originally arisen due to the practice occurring frequently in gymnasiums, where it was more accepted. 

Historians have also commented on elements of sexuality within the context of the ancient Olympic Games specifically. Author and Olympic historian Tony Perrottet has said that while Greek poets wrote odes to the bodies of the men, contemporaneous cultures like the Persians and the Egyptians thought the concept of naked men engaging in physical activity together "promoted sexual degeneracy". The ancient Olympic Games were undertaken in the nude, though this was not initially the case. Historians have connected this nudity to the tradition of men entering adulthood parading naked as a rite of passage. Emeritus professor Nick Fisher wrote that "men believed that nakedness… should reveal the perfection of the trained body and that an erotic response to muscular, bronzed bodies gleaming with olive oil, like statues, was a natural part of the admiration elicited by divinely gifted beauty and skills." Anthropologist Greg Laden described the ancient Olympics as "a softly pornographic group voyeuristic tournament".

Some Ancient Olympians noted for stigmatised adult relationships include the general and statesman Alcibiades, a successful Olympic chariot racer (taking first, second and fourth in 416BC) who had a much-studied relationship with Socrates, also notoriously having many mistresses; and stadion run winner Diocles of Corinth, who moved to Thebes to live with Philolaus of Corinth (of the Bacchiadae) and would be buried with him. In Thebes, Philolaus was a legislator who successfully advocated for adult male unions. Pythagoras of Samos was turned away from the boys' boxing contest and made to compete with the men, while being mocked for being effeminate; he also won the event. Gymnast Iccus of Taranto and pankratiast Kleitomachos were instead known for their abstinence, Kleitomachos supposedly to the point that he could not stand to even hear sex mentioned.

During the height of the popularity of the Olympics, many Greek athletes would spend significant periods of the Olympiad training in specific conditions – historian David Henry James Larmour noted ten months and Eusebius wrote that, during his time, it was sixteen months – including "apparently" having to abstain from sexual intercourse with women.

Cotswold Olimpick Games 
In the early 17th century (likely 1612), the Cotswold Olimpick Games, inspired by the ancient Games and somewhat recognised as a precursor to the modern Olympic movement by the International Olympic Committee (IOC), were founded by Robert Dover with the approval of James I. The personal relationships of James with male courtiers has been noted, and he expressly wanted the Games to be celebrated with an air of pageantry, providing fine clothes for Dover. In the middle of the century, Puritanism grew, and, with it, an increased dislike for the monarchy and for celebration. Upon James' death, the Games suffered; they ended at the outbreak of the Civil War but were revived during the Restoration in 1660, being regularly held for nearly two centuries after this (until 1852), under James' philosophy.

Summer Olympic Games LGBT+ history

1896–1936

Early years
There is a recorded upsurge in both male and female homosexuality in France towards the end of the 19th century, with institutionalised homophobia increasing at the start of the 20th century in correlation. French academic and gay rights activist Louis-Georges Tin noted in 2008 that "from its origin, the Olympic movement produced homophobic residue", citing an essay written by modern Olympic Games founder Pierre de Coubertin from the time, in which Coubertin wrote that sport was the way to restore a man's correct "virile sensibility". Coubertin had previously proposed, in 1887, that school education should be more focused around sport to divert students from sexual perversion. In founding the modern Olympics, he did not allow provisions for women to compete, having said that women taking part in sport makes them ugly to men and so is unnatural.

Despite this, the first Olympic athlete known to be gay was a Frenchman from the fin de siècle; Robert de Montesquiou was a writer and socialite who also rode horses and won the bronze medal in the 1900 Hacks and hunter combined, the only time this event was contested. By 1912, there were two other gay Olympic athletes – both Danish, one of whom was Niels Bukh, who coached his gymnastic team to a gold medal – as well as a male competitor in the art events who may have once had Montesquiou as a lover.

Interwar years
LGBT+ Olympic historian Tony Scupham-Bilton traced gay Olympic athletes back to at least 1928 in a report produced for Outsports in 2016; the athlete in question was Weimar German runner Otto Peltzer, who lived openly gay, though this was not known worldwide; Peltzer set world records in the 1920s and was a prominent international athlete, but did not perform well at the Olympics. Peltzer was able to live openly within the Weimar Republic as, despite homosexuality technically being illegal, it flourished in culture and society of the interwar period, particularly in Berlin. One of the most prominent cultural figures in this period was Renée Sintenis, an openly queer and androgynous artist who won a bronze medal and would be one of seventeen known LGBT+ artists to compete at the Olympics in the interwar years, including two other Germans: fellow gay icon Ludwig von Hofmann and the sculptor Arno Breker. 

A similar flourishing of gay life existed in certain urban communities of the United States in the 1920s, and there were also a significant number of LGBT+ Americans appearing at the Games during this period; Babe Didrikson Zaharias, a lesbian considered the 20th century's best female golfer, won two gold medals and a silver in athletics at the 1932 Olympic Games.

Nazi Olympics

The impact of the rise of Nazism and its attitude towards homosexuality affected the Olympics in the run-up to and at the 1936 Olympic Games. In 1935, Peltzer was arrested, banned from sport, and eventually sent to a concentration camp. Sintenis lived in exile, with her artwork labelled Degenerate.

The Nazis took the chance to use their Games to promote some of their ideology through depicting the ideal Aryan man as a successful Olympic athlete. Since his first Games appearance, Breker had become a favourite of Adolf Hitler and was commissioned to produce statues for the Games. His artwork is known as both homoerotic and Nazi state propaganda, deliberately evoking ancient Greek aesthetics to promote the supposed Aryan physical supremacy; it reflects the homosocial masculine nature of the Nazi vision of utopia, which, paired with the classical sculptural nudity of antiquity, appeared like "a steamy wonderland in which the male body is always on view." Breker's statue for the Berlin Olympiastadion was recreated in miniature as his silver medal-winning competition entry; the full size version features its nude decathlete holding a towel, while the smaller version does not. Another gay Olympian who was supported by Hitler and used for his propaganda was Bukh, invited to demonstrate his gymnastic programme and ideal male physique at the Games; Bukh's support of Nazism, potentially in light of Hitler's support of him, caused an unimpressed ex-lover to out him.

Cultural superiority was also supposed to be on display at the 1936 Games, and also prominently involved LGBT+ Germans; artists other than Breker were encouraged by the Nazis to exhibit and compete for Nazi German glory. The famed dancers and choreographers Harald Kreutzberg, gay and androgynous, and Mary Wigman, probably bisexual, were the main architects of the showcase, which was run as a demonstration event. After the Games, Wigman was also labelled Degenerate.

At the 1936 Games, there were several noted incidents of sex verification among athletes in women's events. It was rudimentary, did not result in exclusions, and may have been biased; Helen Stephens said that, after she and Stella Walsh were both accused of being men, Hitler grabbed at her to confirm she was biologically female. It is not known if Walsh was similarly checked, but an autopsy would show that Walsh had intersex characteristics, as did German athlete Heinrich Ratjen (competing as Dora Ratjen); Stephens and Walsh won medals, while Ratjen did not. Ratjen, who competed as female but identified as male, was later banned from sport by his country, though also claimed he had been made to compete as female so that Nazi Germany had a better chance of winning.

1948–1996

Post-war period
In 1948, the last artistic events were contested, and the last contemporaneously out Olympian would be seen until 1984. Mirroring society and the sporting world at large, the later decades of the 20th century saw significant homophobia as well as lack of sexual education; it has been reported that between 1950 and 1990, "many gay individuals... thought they were the only gay person in the world," which was also true among male Olympians. While in some countries, civil rights movements campaigned for LGBT+ equality throughout this period, some with scientific backing, homosexuality was still considered an outlier; there were some successes in the 1970s, including homosexuality being no longer listed as an illness by the American Psychological Association in 1973. However, the 1976 Summer Olympics held in Canada saw a programme called "ville propre" be enforced, with police raiding gay bars and other known homosexual hang-outs, enforcing conservatism.

AIDS and Gay Games
The AIDS epidemic, which officially began in 1981, saw a mixture of responses: from some parties there was more empathy for homosexual and bisexual men, and an outpouring of support; from others, there was an increased fear and vitriol, and sharing of the belief that AIDS was a divine punishment for a gay lifestyle.

The Gay Games, founded by gay former Olympian Tom Waddell, began in 1982, as a safe space for LGBT+ athletes to compete. The acceptance among athletes from the Gay Games is said to have crossed over into the Olympics; also including non-Olympic LGBT+ athletes, the Gay Games showed the world and Olympic movement that there are significant numbers of queer people in sport. Reportedly, being able to see "gay athletes in a highly organised event similar to the Olympic Games" caused attitudes to change in sport.

There was at least one contemporaneously out male LGBT+ athlete at each Summer Olympic Games from 1984 to 1996, with a steady increase over the period.

2000–present

At the end of the 20th century, after the crest of the AIDS crisis, significant media attention in the United States was given to promoting LGBT+ equality, and positive cultural depictions of LGBT+ people returned to the mainstream in Western nations (for example, Ellen DeGeneres coming out in 1997), which helped to normalise not just gay people, but moreover the act of coming out itself, to people in these countries. In the early years of the 21st century, various Western nations decriminalised sodomy and legalised civil partnerships and marriage for same-sex couples. Transgender activism took off, and the internet was said to be a useful tool for popularising and ultimately globalising equality movements.

Transgender athletes were first allowed to compete in 2004.

In the 2008 Summer Olympics in Beijing, only 15 athletes out of the 10,708 participants were openly gay, lesbian or bisexual. Of them only two, including Matthew Mitcham (who also won a gold medal, making him the first openly gay Olympic champion), were male. Mitcham gained media coverage in Australia as reporters thought he was the first Australian to compete in the Olympics as an openly gay person at the time. However, Mathew Helm, the Australian diver who won the silver medal at the 2004 Summer Olympics in the men's 10m platform, had publicly announced he was gay before the Olympics began. Other notable gay Australian Olympians include Ji Wallace, who competed at the 2000 Summer Olympics and won a silver medal in the inaugural trampoline event; however, he came out after the Games. Patricia Nell Warren noted in 2008 that, besides some notable faces, most out Olympians (even medalists) were still being overlooked both for their athletic achievements and by the LGBT+ community. She said that the courage in coming out and opening themselves to homophobia in sport should be more openly acknowledged. Mike Horton, a spokesperson for amateur gay sports in the United States, suggested that simply coming out and winning would not create a legacy of inspiring LGBT+ children to enter sports on its own, that the athletes would have to become public advocates.

Ahead of the 2012 Summer Olympics, the organising committee had included diversity and acceptance in its bid, and approached LGBT+ athletes to encourage participation.

In the 2012 Summer Olympics in London, 23 athletes out of the 10,768 participants were openly gay, lesbian or bisexual. LOCOG was the first organizing committee in Olympic history to include a commitment to diversity in its bid. The organizers publicly supported pro-LGBT concerns during the lead-up to the Games, such as during Pride London 2010, when special pins featuring the Games' emblem and a rainbow flag were sold as part of a wider range celebrating various aspects of diversity. LOCOG chief executive Paul Deighton stated that its vision was "as bold as it is simple – to use the power of the Games to inspire change. We want to reach out to all parts of the community and connect them with London 2012".

A slightly larger number of LGBT athletes competed in London, with 23 out of more than 10,000 competitors, and only three gay men. Outsports co-founder Jim Buzinski considered it to be an "absurdly low number", and considered that in comparison to the arts, politics or business worlds, "sports is still the final closet in society".

In the 2016 Summer Olympics in Rio de Janeiro, a record 68 athletes out of the 10,444 participants were openly gay, lesbian or bisexual, nearly double the LGBT athletes who took part in the 2012 Summer Olympics. There were no openly transgender athletes, but Rolling Stone magazine reported that two transgender athletes would compete in Rio, based on anonymous details in IOC papers. 51 women and 18 men - who are now openly LGBT -  competed in this Olympiade (some came out afterwards). One other LGBT athlete was known to compete at the time, but did not wish to be identified due to still being in the closet. The Games also featured the first same-sex married couple to compete, Helen and Kate Richardson-Walsh, British field hockey players.

"Rainbow Olympics" 
The 2020 Summer Olympics, delayed by the COVID-19 pandemic and held in summer 2021 in Tokyo, have been nicknamed the "Rainbow Olympics" due to not only the significant increase in openly LGBT+ athletes, but also for many of these athletes desiring visibility or taking activist stances. There were three times as many openly queer athletes at Tokyo as there were in Rio, with Outsports able to name at least 185 publicly out LGBTQ athletes by the end of the Games, more contemporaneously out athletes than all previous Summer and Winter Games combined. Despite this, the percentage of LGBT+ individuals among all athletes at Tokyo was still lower than that in the general population. There were also the first appearances of out transgender athletes at Tokyo, with one of these (Canadian footballer Quinn) winning a gold medal, making them the first openly transgender Olympic champion.

Winter Olympic Games LGBT+ history 

During the 1976 Winter Games in Innsbruck athletes such as John Curry from Great Britain were outed before the closing ceremony.

Of the 2,566 athletes who participated in the 2010 Winter Olympics in Vancouver, only six athletes, all women, were openly lesbian or bisexual.

2014–present 

Since 2014, the Winter Olympics have been exclusively held in nations with no anti-discrimination protections for LGBT+ people: Russia, South Korea, and China. Particularly in anticipation of the Russia-hosted Sochi 2014 Games, there has been defiance, with athletes and representatives from nations with LGBT+ protections openly protesting Russia's laws, and using rhetoric to promote their pro-LGBT+ stance. Between 2011 and 2014 in the United States, sporting culture saw a pro-LGBT+ stance become aligned with a pro-Western values, and thus pro-American, position when set in contrast to Russia, with sponsors aligning themselves with this stance for the Olympics and maintaining it within the regular sporting calendar afterwards. In the face of Western-aligned Olympic committees being called to boycott, Belle Brockhoff, who had chosen to come out ahead of competing in Sochi, was said to exemplify the feeling of many athletes in saying: "After I compete, I'm willing to rip on [Putin's] ass. I'm not happy and there's a bunch of other Olympians who are not happy either." The sentiment was seen as athletes wanting to compete and to then make statements while in Russia.

Sixteen out athletes — twelve women and four men — participated in the 2018 Winter Olympics in Pyeongchang, South Korea. It marked the first time in the history of the Winter Olympics that male athletes competed who were openly gay; Canadian figure skater Eric Radford became the first out gay male athlete ever to win a Winter Olympic gold medal, while figure skater Adam Rippon became the first American out gay male athlete ever to win a Winter Olympic medal, both in Team Figure Skating. Radford later also won Bronze in Pairs Figure Skating. A fifth male athlete, Guillaume Cizeron, came out after the event.

According to Outsports, at least 36 publicly out LGBTQ athletes competed in the 2022 Winter Olympics in Beijing. Timothy LeDuc of the United States became the first openly non-binary athlete to compete in a Winter Olympics.

Paralympic Games LGBT+ history 

At least two out athletes competed in the 2012 Summer Paralympics in London.

At least 12 out athletes participated in the 2016 Summer Paralympics in Rio de Janeiro, with 10 coming home with medals. In addition, there were two coaches who are openly LGBT, with the U.S. women's wheelchair basketball head coach, Stephanie Wheeler and her assistant coach, Amy Spangler.

At least one openly LGBT athlete competed in the 2018 Winter Paralympics in PyeongChang.

The 2020 Summer Paralympics, delayed by the COVID-19 pandemic, was held in summer 2021. According to Outsports, at least 36 athletes who competed are openly LGBTQ. At least three athletes who competed are nonbinary or neutral, namely Robyn Lambird of Australia, Laura Goodkind of the United States, and Maria "Maz" Strong of Australia.

Pride Houses
Pride Houses are a dedicated temporary location designed to play host to LGBT athletes, volunteers and visitors attending the Olympics, Paralympics or other international sporting event in the host city. The first attempt to organize a Pride House was for the 1992 Barcelona Olympics; the first that happened was for the Vancouver 2010 Winter Olympics.  Both Pride Houses at Vancouver (one in the city, one in the mountains in Whistler) offered information and support services to LGBT athletes and attendees, with the Whistler location in Pan Pacific Village Centre also having a "celebratory theme", and the Vancouver venue emphasising education about Vancouver's LGBT community and, for non-Canadian athletes, information about immigration to and asylum in Canada, including "legal resources" from Egale Canada and the International Lesbian, Gay, Bisexual, Trans and Intersex Association (ILGA).

An attempt to create a Pride House at the 2014 Winter Olympics in Sochi, Russia was struck down by the Ministry of Justice, which refused to approve the registration of the NGO set up to organize the Pride House. The ban was upheld by Krasnodar Krai Judge Svetlana Mordovina on the basis of the Pride House inciting "propaganda of non-traditional sexual orientation which can undermine the security of the Russian society and the state, provoke social-religious hatred, which is the feature of the extremist character of the activity".

As it became clear that no Pride House could take place in Sochi, a number of leading LGBT sports organisations worked together to promote the idea of cities elsewhere hosting their own Pride Houses during the Sochi Olympics. Pride House Toronto, which was set to be the largest Pride House ever and preparing to host visitors during the 2015 Pan American Games at the time of the Sochi Olympics, was already very advanced with its plans for a series of events during the Sochi Olympics highlighting the anti-LGBT laws and LGBT rights in Russia in general. In addition to Pride House Toronto, a group led by Pride Sports UK hosted other Pride Houses, with Manchester being the largest. Other cities across North America, Western Europe, New Zealand, and Brazil, also expressed interest in hosting Pride Houses during the Sochi Olympics.

Sport and gender statistics 
The vast majority of openly LGBT+ Olympians are female; of these, most are lesbians. At Tokyo 2020, out female athletes outnumbered the out men by about 9:1. Outsports felt that the low percentage, 0.3% at Tokyo 2020, of male athletes being openly LGBT+ was not a true reflection of the percentage of men within sport who are LGBT+, instead suggesting that a sporting culture keeps men closeted. Short of 2% of all athletes at Tokyo 2020 were openly LGBT+, which was also deemed lower than the statistics in the world at large, with the deficiency similarly attributed to homophobic sporting culture. Monash University behavioural scientist Erik Denison said, in response to the statistics, that male sports are stereotyped to a particular image of masculinity, while female sports are stereotyped to an image of aggression that defies femininity and assumes the participants are lesbians.

Outsports noted that the majority of the out male athletes were "equestrian or in a pool", with the equestrian and aquatic sports accounting for nearly 60% of out male athletes. In winter sport, figure skating is a sport that has been stereotyped as having many gay male athletes, though accounts also say men in figure skating have been closeted due to homophobia within the sport, the fear judges will down mark anything non-traditional, and fear of losing sponsors; without outing any athletes in particular, insiders have estimated that around half of male Olympic figure skating medalists are LGBT+.

In women's sport, football is noted as having high numbers of out athletes, though this has been argued to have created prejudice against women's football itself because of the assumption all players are lesbians and the preexisting prejudice towards lesbians. The event with the highest number of out LGBT+ Olympic athletes is football, nearly all women.

Success 
Approximately half of all LGBT+ Olympians have won an Olympic medal. Outsports reported that of the 104 openly gay and lesbian participants in the Summer Olympics up to and including 2012 (and publicly out by 2014), 53% had won a medal. Including only those out ahead of the 2012 Games, LGBT+ athletes that year were six times as likely to win a gold medal compared to all athletes. Cyd Zeigler, founder of Outsports, suggested that this could be the result of the relieved focus and lack of "burden" an athlete would have after coming out; that "high-level athletes" are more likely to feel secure in coming out as their careers have been established; or their performance was mere coincidence and had no correlation with their sexual orientation at all. University of Winchester sociology and sexology researcher Eric Anderson has found that the comparative success of out LGBT+ athletes can be related to them only feeling comfortable to come out when they "have the sporting capital to negate the problems they encounter".

Mark Tewksbury and Greg Louganis, who were among the best in their sports, remarked that feeling personally accepted enough to share their sexuality may have been the psychological burden relieved to allow them to improve. Curler Bruce Mouat has said that, in his team sport, he found that coming out made him more emotionally available and improved his dynamic with his team, seeing them to medal success. Various athletes have reported improved results after coming out, even privately, and some of the most successful sportspeople of their times have been LGBT+ and entered the Olympics.

Visibility and recognition 
The importance of having visible out LGBT+ athletes at the Olympics has been noted due to the global nature of the event and the potential for cultural exchange, with athletes from less progressive nations able to positively interact with openly queer athletes and take their experiences back to their own countries. Outsports, which gives a platform to many coming-out stories from sports personalities, has the tagline "courage is contagious", expressing that visibility is vital for sports at large to become more welcoming to the LGBT+ community, and as inspiration for other people to come out. Research published in the Journal of Homosexuality suggests that, in the 2010s, more social attention is given to already-successful athletes who come out, particularly those with Olympic or world championship success, than to athletes who are less prominent when they come out.

LGBT+ legislation in host cities

Montreal 1976 
In the years before the 1976 Summer Olympics in Montreal, Quebec, Canada, the nation began somewhat re-criminalising gay sexual activities (officially decriminalised, a law against prostitution was instead applied) and, in February 1975, began enforcing this in Quebec and Ontario, and also actively seeking out people in Montreal suspected of homosexuality to arrest, generally for immorality or as supposed security threats, in a "clean city" ("ville propre") campaign. Gay sex was labelled a vice, with the Royal Canadian Mounted Police being brought in to raid known gay and lesbian spaces, sometimes violently, including bars and bathhouses. Sport and gender activist Helen Lenskyj wrote that the move "suggested a kind of puritanical embarrassment at the prospect that Olympic visitors might actually see gay men and lesbians on the streets"; the Montreal Organising Committee worked with the local politicians, with their official stance being that "all non-conforming elements of which homosexuals are included, must be confined and made hidden". Though activist groups were also targeted, the "clean-up" campaign has otherwise been described as an ardent form of moral cleansing and sexual policing. Rather than intimidate the queer population out of the city as hoped, it instead resulted in new anti-repression activist groups being founded and the largest Canadian gay rights protests ever at the time being held.

Sochi 2014 

In the 2014 Winter Olympics in Sochi, Russia, seven openly gay women competed. Russia's stance on LGBT rights were a major concern during the lead-up to these Games; in 2012, an attempt to obtain a Pride House was denied, and, in June 2013, Russia became the subject of international criticism after it passed a federal "gay propaganda law", which made it a criminal offence to distribute materials classified as "propaganda of non-traditional sexual relationships" among minors. Russia attempted to quell concerns about the propaganda law by allowing designated protest zones during the Games; media found this unsatisfactory.

2014 anti-discrimination provision 

Marc Naimark of the Federation of Gay Games called "the lack of openly gay athletes" a symptom, not the problem, of the Olympic Games. He said the IOC should pressure countries to repeal anti-gay laws the same way it once excluded South Africa for its apartheid system of racial segregation, and "more recently, succeeded in getting all competing nations to include female athletes on their teams in London [2012]". In 2014, after that year's Winter Olympics were held in Russia, the IOC amended its host city contracts for the 2022 Winter Olympics to include an anti-discrimination provision based on Principle 6 of the Olympic Charter (which itself includes sexual orientation).

Tokyo 2020 
Though the 2020 Games have been called the "Rainbow Olympics", the media noted that host nation Japan was the only one of the G7 industrialised nations not to allow same-sex marriage, and to not have any openly queer athletes at the Games. In the run-up to the Games, LGBT+ activists in Japan had hoped the attention of the world would encourage positive change; an anti-discrimination bill was debated, but did not pass, in the National Diet. While Japan had a political agenda through the 2010s, specifically looking ahead to the Games, to "[encourage] the positive reinterpretation of sexual minorities as important new consumers and a tourist niche", the attempts have been described as based in stereotypes and not substantive.

Sex verification and intersex athletes 

Since 1968, athletes who have been accused of competing in the wrong gender category have been subject to physical examinations. All female athletes were required to undergo sex verification between 1968 and 1998, which was said to prevent men and "women with unfair ... advantage" from competing in women's events. The issue of sex verification was first raised in the 1960s, when it was uncertain if masculine-appearing women were a product of systemic doping or were male impersonators. Initial examinations involved physically appraising the genitals of the women before the IOC moved to use a less degrading chromosome test; this was also criticised as, while typically women have two X chromosomes and men one X and one Y, there are various possible deviations that do not have a substantial effect.

In the 1980s and 1990s, the IOC and World Athletics (then, IAAF) had several meetings in which they confirmed that preventing male imposters in women's events – i.e. gender, not sex, verification – was the aim; their actions differed, however, with sex testing, especially for androgen bodies, persisting and excluding intersex athletes while never discovering a male imposter. With genetic laboratories having stopped using the unreliable X chromosome tests in the 1970s, the IOC finally followed suit for the Winter Olympics in 1992; the IAAF abolished all testing later that year. At the 1996 Games, eight (unknown) female athletes were discovered to have an intersex condition upon testing (seven with androgen insensitivity); all were cleared to compete and, after the Games, the IOC abolished the universal testing so as to protect the dignity of athletes who do not already know they have these conditions.

Various international medical and sports professionals have, since 1986, advocated for sex verification in sport, and specifically the Olympics, to be abolished. In 2000, following the 1999 IOC ratification of the 1996 decision to discontinue sex verification, the view was reiterated in the Journal of the American Medical Association; it included commentary that, while the purpose of such tests is to uphold a perceived fairness, the insufficiency of the tests can produce unfair results due to potential inaccuracies and the possibility of both false negatives and false positives. The authors also deemed the tests unfair and discriminatory towards female athletes with disorders of sex development (DSD), whom it felt should be considered as women for the purposes of sport, as "few if any plausible athletic advantages exist". It also considered the implications for female athletes who "fail" a test, either as a false positive or through unknowingly having a DSD, both in their personal lives and future career, as too severe to impose the tests.

However, since 2000, testing has still been enforced for athletes of any gender (though invariably women) when "serious doubts" have been raised. In 2012, the IOC changed its mode of verification, testing for testosterone, despite the fact that people with androgen insensitivity cannot use any testosterone in their blood. In 2018, World Athletics began requiring intersex women to medically or surgically alter themselves in order to be eligible, which could prevent them from attending events that serve as Olympic qualifiers, as was the case with transgender athlete CeCé Telfer in 2021.

Overview of LGBT+ Olympians

See also

 Homosexuality in modern sports
 The Front Runner (novel)
 Transgender people in sports

Notes

References

Further reading
Baniak, M. & Jobling, I. (2014) "Homosexuality and the Olympic Movement", Journal of Olympic History, International Society of Olympic Historians

External links
 Olympic Pride: The History of LGBT Participation in the Olympics an overview by each Olympic Game.
 LGBT Olympians, as of 20 July 2012, includes country, sport and games attended, medals won, and other information.

Olympic and Paralympic
LGBT
LGBT